The 66th Women's Boat Race took place on 27 March 2011.  The race was conducted as part of the Henley Boat Races and took place at Henley-on-Thames.  Oxford won by one length in a time of 6 minutes 24 seconds, their fourth consecutive win.  The victory took the overall record in the event to 40–26 in Cambridge's favour.

Background
The Women's Boat Race is a side-by-side rowing competition between Oxford University Women's Boat Club (OUWBC) and the Cambridge University Women's Boat Club (CUWBC) that has taken place since 1927.  It was conducted as part of the Henley Boat Races, on the traditional straight course at Henley-on-Thames.  Oxford went into the race as champions, having won the 2010 race by four lengths, with Cambridge leading 40–25 overall.  The race was sponsored by Newton Investment Management, a subsidiary of The Bank of New York Mellon, for the first time.

The umpire for the race was Mark Blandford-Baker, bursar of Magdalen College, Oxford.

Crews
Trials for the crews were held in December 2010. Oxford's trial boats raced along the Adelaide Straight in Ely and were named Keep Calm and Carry On.

Oxford's crew included Natalie Redgrave, the daughter of five-time Olympic gold medallist Steve Redgrave.

Race

The winners' shield was presented by Olympic bronze medallist and former Cambridge college rower Anna Watkins.

See also
The Boat Race 2011

References

External links
Official website

Women's Boat Race
Boat
2011 in English sport
March 2011 sports events in the United Kingdom
2011 in women's rowing
2011 sports events in London